The Villa Gandolfi Pallavicini is a prominent suburban Baroque villa located on Via Martelli 22/24 in Bologna, Italy. It presently houses the Fondazione Alma Mater, an alumni association of the University of Bologna. The villa is also used for private functions.

History
The villa was built by the aristocratic Alamandini family in the early 17th century, and in 1773 it was purchased by the Genoese Giovanni Luca Pallavicini, who was a Field marshal of the Holy Roman Empire. In 1770, a young Mozart stayed here in preparation for appearing before the Accademia Filarmonica di Bologna. The interior is frescoed with landscapes, quadratura, and mythologic themes.

References

Villas in Emilia-Romagna
Buildings and structures in Bologna
Baroque architecture in Bologna
1700s establishments in Italy
Baroque villas